Décollage, in art, is the opposite of collage; instead of an image being built up of all or parts of existing images, it is created by cutting, tearing away or otherwise removing, pieces of an original image. The French word "décollage" translates into English literally as "take-off" or "to become unglued" or "to become unstuck". Examples of décollage include etrécissements and cut-up technique. A similar technique is the lacerated poster, a poster in which one has been placed over another or others, and the top poster or posters have been ripped, revealing to a greater or lesser degree the poster or posters underneath.

Practitioners of décollage
An important practitioner of décollage was Wolf Vostell. Wolf Vostell noticed the word "décollage" in Le Figaro on 6 September 1954, where it was used to describe the simultaneous take-off and crash of an aeroplane. He appropriated the term to signify an aesthetic philosophy, applied also to the creation of live performances, Vostell’s working concept of décollage, was the Dé-coll/age and begun in 1954, is as a visual force that breaks down outworn values and replaces them with thinking as a function distanced from media. He also called his Happenings Dé-coll/age-Happening.

The most celebrated artists of the décollage technique in France, especially of the lacerated poster, are François Dufrene, Jacques Villeglé, Mimmo Rotella and Raymond Hains. Raymond Hains used the lacerated poster as an artistic intervention that sought to critique the newly emerged advertising technique of large-scale advertisements. In effect his decollage destroys the advertisement, but leaves its remnants on view for the public to contemplate. Often these artists worked collaboratively and it was their intention to present their artworks in the city of Paris anonymously. These four artists were part of a larger group in the 1960s called Nouveau Réalisme (New realism), Paris' answer to the American Pop Art movement. This was a mostly Paris-based group (which included Yves Klein, Christo and Burhan Dogancay and was created with the help of critic Pierre Restany), although Rotella was Italian and moved back to Italy shortly after the group was formed. Some early practitioners sought to extract the defaced poster from its original context and to take it into areas of poetry, photography, or painting.

Lacerated posters are also closely related to Richard Genovese's practice of excavations. Contemporary artists employing similar décollage techniques are Mark Bradford, Michael Viviani and Brian Dettmer, who employs a novel method of decollage by removing material from books, leaving behind select images and text to form sculptural collages. Also there is Fizz Fieldgrass, an English artist, who uses digitally enhanced photographic images, overlaid by duplication on either Japanese Conservation Grade or fine Paper Mulberry, torn and rolled back to reveal other layers generating the three-dimensional image.

Décollage is now commonly used in the French language in regard to aviation (as when an aeroplane lifts off the ground). More recently the term has been used in space flight; the web page for ESA indicates its use equivalent to "We have lift-off!" at a NASA launch center.

Déchirage
Déchirage (from the French, déchirer: 'to tear') is an artistic style that distresses paper to create a three-dimensional patchwork. It is a form of décollage, taking the original image apart physically through incision, parting and peeling away. Romare Bearden (b. 1911 – d. 1988) the African American collage artist used déchirage as an important element of his abstract expressionist paintings. The first public display of "Photographic" Déchirage (the tearing of layers of digital photographs to create a distinctive three-dimensional image) was at the Art of Giving exhibition at the Saatchi Gallery in 2010.

It can be argued that the depliage is a form of décollage, as it is made by initially removing the staples from a staple-bound magazine.

Literature
  Phasen. Jürgen Becker und Wolf Vostell, Galerie Der Spiegel, Köln 1960.
TPL, François Dufrêne, Alain Jouffroy, Wolf Vostell, Verlag Der Kalender, Wuppertal 1961.
 Dufrene, Hains, Rotella, Villegle, Vostell: Plakatabrisse aus der Sammlung Cremer, Staatsgalerie Stuttgart, 1971
 Ulrich Krempel: Nouveau Réalisme. Revolution des Alltäglichen, Hatje Cantz, Ostfildern 2007, 
 Pierre Restany: Manifeste des Nouveaux Réalistes. Éditions Dilecta, Paris 2007
 Wolf Vostell. Dé-coll/age, Editorial Pintan Espadas No.10, 2008, 
 Raymond Hains. Akzente 1949–1995. Ritter-Verlag, Klagenfurt 1995, 
 Dé-coll/age und Happening. Studien zum Werk von Wolf Vostell, Ludwig, Kiel 2012, 
 Klaus Gereon Beuckers und Hans-Edwin Friedrich: dé-coll/age als Manifest, Manifest als dé-coll/age. Manifeste, Aktionsvorträge und Essays von Wolf Vostell, = neoavantgarden, Bd. 3, edition text + kritik: München 2014, .
 Poesie der Grossstadt. Die Affichisten. Bernard Blistène, Fritz Emslander, Esther Schlicht, Didier Semin, Dominique Stella. Snoeck Verlag. 2014.

See also
 Art movement
 Creativity techniques
 Fluxus
 List of art media
 List of artistic media
 List of art movements
 List of art techniques
 List of most expensive paintings
 List of most expensive sculptures
 List of sculptors
 Organic décollage

Footnotes

External links
 Dé-coll/ages by Wolf Vostell

Artistic techniques
Surrealist techniques
Posters
Nouveau réalisme